Jane Dillon (née Young) is a British designer, educator and artist.  She made significant contributions to furniture and Architectural lighting design across America and Europe. One of the few female international designers of her generation, Dillon's work encompassed contract and domestic furniture, lighting, textiles and glassware.

Dillon was a pupil at Adcote School in Shropshire, then studied design at Manchester College of Art, then furniture at Royal College of Art (RCA) in London. Between 1968 and 1971, Dillon worked at Olivetti in Milan under Ettore Sottsass.  She later founded her own studio, Charles and Jane Dillon Associates, in London.

For over 30 years, Dillon taught design at the RCA and was made an Honorary Fellow in 2007. Her complete studio archives are held at the Victoria and Albert Museum.

References

Further reading

 Lesley Jackson, Modern British Furniture: Design Since 1945, V&A Museum Publishing, 2013
 Fiona MacCarthy (ed.), The Perfect Place to Grow: 175 Years of the Royal College of Art, Royal College of Art, 2012.
 Deyan Sudjic, Terence Conran: The Way We Live Now, Design Museum, 2011.
 Giorgio Maffei, Bruno Tonini and Ettore Sottsass, Books by Ettore Sottsass, Corraini Editore, 2011.
 Lesley Jackson, The Sixties: Decade of Design Revolution, Phaidon Press, 2000.
 Charlotte & Peter Fiell, ‘Multipla by Jane Dillon and Peter Wheeler’ in 1000 CHAIRS, Taschen, 1997. pp. 661.

British furniture designers
Product designers
British industrial designers
Living people
Alumni of the Royal College of Art
Year of birth missing (living people)